Haroldo Domingues (born 18 March 1896, date of death unknown), known as just Haroldo, was a Brazilian footballer. He played in four matches for the Brazil national football team from 1917 to 1919. He was also part of Brazil's squad for the 1917 South American Championship.

References

External links
 

1896 births
Year of death missing
Brazilian footballers
Brazil international footballers
Place of birth missing
Association footballers not categorized by position